Jarred Cole (born 28 June 2000) is an English professional darts player who plays in events of the World Darts Federation.

Career

2017
Cole first started his professional career playing in British Darts Organisation and Junior Darts Corporation events. In 2017 Cole managed to pick up three wins on the Junior Darts Corporation UK Tour. Further on in 2017 Cole was also selected to play in the 2017 Finder Darts Masters Youth event for the BDO where he won beating Nathan Girvan 2-0 in the Final as of the 21st of February 2019 this remains Coles only TV title.

2018
Cole played in the PDC Development Tour and on the PDC Pro Tour this year and at the PDC Development tour 16 Cole claimed his first PDC Title. Cole had also won a one year scholarship from the PDPA and JDC to play on the Pro Tour but as this expired at the end of 2018 Cole had to go to Q-School at the start of 2019.

2019
Cole went to PDC Q-School where he failed to gain a two-year tour card. Cole has since started playing on the PDC Challenge Tour.

World Championship results

WDF
 2022: Third round (lost to Brian Raman 0-3)

References

2000 births
Living people
Professional Darts Corporation associate players
English darts players
People from Hatfield, Hertfordshire
British Darts Organisation players
Sportspeople from London